The Jubilee Medal "65 Years of Victory in the Great Patriotic War 1941–1945" is a state commemorative medal of the Russian Federation. It was established on March 4, 2009 by Presidential Decree № 238 to denote the 65th anniversary of the 1945 victory over Nazi Germany.

Medal statute 
The Jubilee Medal "65 Years of Victory in the Great Patriotic War 1941–1945" is awarded to soldiers and civilian employees of the Armed Forces of the USSR for participation in hostilities in the Great Patriotic War 1941 – 1945, guerrillas and members of underground organisations operating in occupied territories of the USSR, persons who were awarded the medal "For Victory over Germany" or "For Victory over Japan", persons awarded for their selfless work the Medal "For Valiant Labour in the Great Patriotic War 1941–1945" or "For Labour Merit" or any of the "Defence" medals of the cities or regions of the USSR; to persons who worked in the period from 22 June 1941 to May 9, 1945 for no less than six months, excluding the period of work in the temporarily occupied territories; former under-age prisoners of concentration camps, ghettos and other places of detention established by the Nazis and their allies; foreign nationals from outside the Commonwealth of Independent States who fought in the national military forces in the USSR, as part of guerilla units, underground groups, and other anti-fascist groups who have made significant contribution to victory in the Patriotic War and who were awarded state awards of the USSR or Russian Federation.

Presidential Decree 1099 of September 7, 2010 removed the Jubilee Medal "65 Years of Victory in the Great Patriotic War 1941–1945" from the list of state awards of the Russian Federation. It is no longer awarded.

Medal description 
The Jubilee Medal "65 Years of Victory in the Great Patriotic War 1941–1945" is a 32mm in diameter red brass circular medal.  Its obverse bears the relief image of the Order of Glory, between the two lower rays of the star, the numbers "1945 – 2010." On the reverse, the relief inscription in seven lines "65 Years of Victory in the Great Patriotic War 1941 – 1945.".
 
The medal is suspended by a ring through the award's suspension loop to a standard Russian pentagonal mount covered with an overlapping 24mm wide silk moiré Ribbon of Saint George with 6mm wide red edge stripes.

Notable recipients (partial list) 

The individuals below were all recipients of the Jubilee Medal "65 Years of Victory in the Great Patriotic War 1941–1945".

President of Serbia Boris Tadić
Actress Elina Avraamovna Bystritskaya
Ex labour camp inmate, founding member of the Russian Guild of Heraldic Artists, Yevgeny Ilyich Ukhnalyov
Politician Vladimir Ivanovich Dolgikh
Artillery officer Colonel Ivan Fedorovich Ladyga
Marshal of the Soviet Union Vasily Ivanovich Petrov
Marshal of the Soviet Union Sergei Leonidovich Sokolov
Marshal of the Soviet Union Dmitry Timofeyevich Yazov
Geologist and politician, former deputy of the legislative assembly of Leningrad Marina Yevgenyevna Salye
World War 2 combat medic, Marines Chief Petty Officer Ekaterina Illarionovna Mikhailova-Demina
Veteran of the Defence of Moscow, Vladimir Dolgikh
Veteran of the capture of Vienna Captain 1st grade Timofey Manaenkov
Veteran of the defence of Sevastopol Major General Alexei Elagin
Veteran of the battle of Kursk Major General Ivan Sluhay
Veteran of the capture of Königsberg Colonel General Vasily Reshetnikov
Veteran of the defence of Smolensk Vasilio Gorlanova
Veteran of the liberation of Leningrad and of the 1945 Moscow Victory Parade Nikolay Gorbachev
Veteran of the defence of the Caucasus Nadezhda Popova

Gallery of the first award ceremony 
A selection of photos of the first award ceremony held at the Kremlin on December 4, 2009 where selected veterans of the Great Patriotic War were presented with the Jubilee Medal "65 Years of Victory in the Great Patriotic War 1941–1945".

See also

Awards and decorations of the Russian Federation
Awards and decorations of the Soviet Union

References

External links
 The Commission on State Awards to the President of the Russian Federation
 The Russian Gazette  In Russian

Civil awards and decorations of Russia
Russian awards
Military awards and decorations of Russia
Awards established in 2009
2009 establishments in Russia